Sasha is a unisex name which originated in Eastern and Southern European countries as the shortened version of Alexander and Alexandra. It is also used as a surname, although very rarely.

Usage 
This name is especially common in Europe, where it is used by both females and males as a diminutive of Alexandra and Alexander, respectively. Despite its popularity in informal usage, the name is rarely recorded on birth certificates in countries such as the Czech Republic, Russia, Slovakia, and Ukraine, as it is considered a diminutive, not a formal name. Exceptions are Croatia, Germany, Serbia, Slovenia, Bosnia and Herzegovina, Montenegro, North Macedonia and Switzerland. 

In Italy or in French-speaking regions (Belgium, France, and Quebec), Sacha is almost exclusively given to males. In the United States the name is almost exclusively used for girls and ranked number 569 among U.S. baby names in 2014, although it didn't gain popularity until the 1970s.

Notable people bearing this name

Codenames, stage personas, alter egos
 Sasha (espionage), an alleged Soviet mole in the U.S. Central Intelligence Agency during the Cold War
 Sasha (DJ) (born 1969), born Alexander Coe
 Sasha (Jamaican musician) (born 1974), born Christine Chin
 Sasha (German singer) (born 1972), born Sascha Schmitz
 Sasha Banks (born 1992), American professional wrestler
 Sasha Fierce, Beyoncé's alter ego
 Sasha Velour (born 1987), famous drag queen best known for appearing on RuPaul's Drag Race (season 9)

Animals 
 Sasha (dog) (2004–2008), a Labrador dog that served in the British Army
 Galianora sacha (G. sacha), Ecuadorian jumping spider

Fictitious or mythical entities

Legend, myth, and religion
 Sasha and Zamani, spirits, two stages of time in Central and Eastern African cultures

Fictional animals and creatures 
 Sasha, a character from the movie, Help! I'm a Fish
 Sasha, bird character from Walt Disney's Peter and the Wolf (1946 film)
 Sasha, cat from the book series Warriors by Erin Hunter
 Sacha, desman (water mole) in the animated television program Noah's Island
 Sasha La Fleur, a character from the movie All Dogs Go to Heaven 2, the television series All Dogs Go to Heaven: The Series, and An All Dogs Christmas Carol
 Sasha (Vampire), a character from the Twilight book and film series
 Sasha, female character from the Bratz franchise

Fictional people

By surname
 Sasha Antonov, a character from the 2014 Canadian television series Bitten
 Sasha Barbicon, the owner of an art gallery from the game Titanic: Adventure Out of Time
 Sasha Belov, character from the TV show Make It or Break It
 Sasha Bezmel, character from the Australian soap opera Home and Away
 Sash Bishop, character from the Irish soap opera Fair City
 Sasha Bordeaux, DC Comics character, former ally of Batman
 Sasha Braus, character from the anime/manga series Attack on Titan (Shingeki no Kyojin)
 Saša Bůčková, character from Czech sitcom Comeback
 Sasha Dixon, character in the British soap opera EastEnders
 Alexander "Sasha" Nikolaevich Hell, the protagonist of The Qwaser of Stigmata
 Sasha James, a character from the horror podcast "The Magnus Archives"
 Sascha König, character from the television drama Inspector Rex, episode 8x13
 Sasha Kreutzev, character from the anime/novel series A Certain Magical Index (Toaru Majutsu no Index)
 Sacha Levy, AAU Registrar in the British medical drama series Holby City
 Sasha Nein, powerful Psychonaut and instructor from the game Psychonauts
 Sasha Perkins, character in the British soap opera EastEnders
 Sascha Petrosevitch, character from the 2002 film Half Past Dead
 Sasha Thompson, leader of the Mad Dogs and a target in CHERUB book Mad Dogs
 Sasha Valentine, character in the British soap opera Hollyoaks
 Sasha Waybright, from the American animated series Amphibia 
 Sasha Williams (The Walking Dead), Tyreese's sharpshooter sister on The Walking Dead TV series

Surnameless people
 Sasha, Russian pilot in the 2009 movie 2012 (film)
 Sasha, Ted Mundy's absolute friend in John le Carré's espionage novel Absolute Friends (2003)
 Sasha, commanding officer from the game Advance Wars: Dual Strike
 Sasha, romantic love interest of Ginger in Nickelodeon's As Told by Ginger
 Sascha, a reaper in the manga Black Butler by Yana Toboso
 Sasha, character from the Bratz line of fashion dolls, see List of Bratz characters
 Sascha, the Russian bartender at Rick's Café Américain, played by Leonid Kinskey in Casablanca (1942)
 Sasha, the enigmatic female hacker from the film Cube 2: Hypercube (2003)
 Sasha, the leader of The Reapers gang in Infamous (video game)
 Sasha, the character from the film The Last Station (2009)
 Sasha, the Muscovite princess in the novel Orlando: A Biography by Virginia Woolf
 Sasha, the character from the Japanese manga Pita-Ten
 Sasha, the reincarnation of Athena in the manga Saint Seiya: The Lost Canvas
 Sasha, character from Adult Swim's Titan Maximum
 Captain Sasha from the Ratchet & Clank series
 Sweet Sasha, a doll from Ty Girlz
 Sasha, a rabbit villager in the video game Animal Crossing: New Horizons

Inanimate objects
 Sasha is the name Heavy gives to his minigun in the game Team Fortress 2

Similar names
Similar names in various languages include:
 Albanian: Dasha, Vasha
 Danish: Sasja
 Dutch: Saskia
 English: Sasha
 French: Sacha
 Georgian: Lasha
 German: Sascha
 Hindi: Asha, Sashi, Shashi, Shikha
 Macedonian: Sashka, Sasho
 Muslim: Salha
 Nepali: Asha, Aasha, Sashi
 Persian: Pasha, Rasha
 Portuguese: Sancha
 Russian: Саша, Sashka
 Serbo-Croatian: Saša (Safiha / Sabiha in Bosnian)
 Slovak: Saša, Saška
 Slovenian: Saša
 Spanish: Sancha
 Swedish: Sassa
 Swiss: Sascha
 Thai: Sasicha
 Turkish: Saliha, Sabiha

See also
 Satyana

References

Slavic given names
Unisex given names
English-language unisex given names
Feminine given names
Masculine given names
English unisex given names
Russian masculine given names
German unisex given names